Horses and Grasses is the first and only studio album by the comedy band Hard 'n Phirm, released in 2005.

Track listing
 The Carbon Cycle  – 2:19
 American Dinosaurs  – 3:32
 An Intro  – 0:35
 Pi  – 3:14
 Ready  – 0:22
 She Named the Pony Jesus  – 5:05
 Pneumatica (Part I)  – 0:41
 Moose Lodge  – 2:04
 Fitter Clappier  – 2:35
 Rodeohead  – 4:56
 The Camping Song  – 0:46
 El Corazón  – 3:46
 Wasted  – 0:26
 Anything  – 2:54
 Funkhauser  – 7:04

External links
Horses and Grasses on CDBaby
Video of Hard n' Phirm song "Pi" directed by Keith Schofield

2005 debut albums
Hard 'n Phirm albums
Self-released albums